Toluca Cathedral, formally Cathedral of Saint Joseph of Nazareth is a Roman Catholic cathedral in the city of Toluca, Mexico, named after Saint Joseph.

The cathedral's construction began in 1867, but was completed only in the second half of the twentieth century. The Neoclassical facade features the images of Saint John, Saint Thomas, Saint Peter and Saint James. There is also a relief depicting the Ascension of Jesus. Above the clock there are three female figures representing faith, charity and hope.

History

For the construction of the cathedral the Rosario Chapel and the Chapel of San Joseph were demolished. These buildings were located on the large plot belonging to the old Franciscan convent of Our Lady of the Assumption.

References

Buildings and structures in the State of Mexico
Roman Catholic cathedrals in Mexico
Toluca
1867 establishments in Mexico
Roman Catholic churches completed in 1978
20th-century Roman Catholic church buildings in Mexico